The 2001 Women's County One-Day Championship was the 5th cricket Women's County Championship season. It took place in July and August and saw 20 county teams compete in a series of divisions. Yorkshire Women won the County Championship as winners of the top division, achieving their fourth Championship title in five seasons.

Competition format 
Teams played matches within a series of divisions with the winners of the top division being crowned County Champions. Matches were played using a one day format with 50 overs per side.

The championship works on a points system with positions within the divisions being based on the total points. Points were awarded as follows:

Win: 12 points. 
Tie:  6 points. 
Loss: Bonus points.
No Result: 11 points.
Abandoned: 11 points.

Up to five batting and five bowling points per side were also available.

Teams
The 2001 Championship consisted of 17 teams: the top two divisions with six teams apiece and Division Three with five teams. Teams played each other once. The Emerging Counties competition was also competed in 2001: a tier below the County Championship, consisting of three teams, playing each other once.

County Championship

Division One 

Source: Cricket Archive

Division Two 

Source: Cricket Archive

Division Three 

Source: Cricket Archive

Emerging Counties
Durham were promoted to join Division Three. Full match results and table are unrecorded.

Statistics

Most runs

Source: CricketArchive

Most wickets

Source: CricketArchive

References

2001